Lot 12 is a township in Prince County, Prince Edward Island, Canada.  It is part of Halifax Parish. Lot 12 was awarded to merchants Hutchinson Mure and Robert Cathcart in the 1767 land lottery, and by 1806 was partially owned by the Earl of Selkirk.

Communities

First Nations:

 Lennox Island First Nation

Incorporated municipalities:

 Ellerslie-Bideford
 Lady Slipper
 Lot 11 and Area

Civic address communities:

 East Bideford
 Ellerslie-Bideford
 Enmore
 Inverness
 Lennox Island
 McNeills Mills
 Mount Pleasant
 North Enmore
 Poplar Grove

References

12
Geography of Prince County, Prince Edward Island